Julio Fis Rousseduy (born October 28, 1974 in Guantanamo, Cuba) is a Spanish handball player who currently plays for CB Ciudad de Logroño of the Spanish Liga ASOBAL. His most usual position is left full-back.

Clubs
Győr 
Nyíregyháza 
CD Bidasoa 
BM Ciudad Real 
THW Kiel 
BM Valladolid 
BM Ciudad Real 
CB Ciudad de Logroño  Currently

National team
 : ? caps in the 1990s
 :	23 caps and 47 goals between 2005 and 2006

Trophies

References

1974 births
Living people
Spanish male handball players
Liga ASOBAL players
BM Ciudad Real players
Spanish people of Cuban descent
Sportspeople from Guantánamo